Chris Hani (28 June 1942 – 10 April 1993), born Martin Thembisile Hani , was the leader of the South African Communist Party and chief of staff of uMkhonto we Sizwe, the armed wing of the African National Congress (ANC). He was a fierce opponent of the apartheid government, and was assassinated by Janusz Waluś, a Polish immigrant and sympathiser of the Conservative opposition on 10 April 1993, during the unrest preceding the transition to democracy.

Early life
Thembisile Hani was born on 28 June 1942 in the Xhosa village in Cofimvaba, Transkei. He was the fifth of six children. He attended Lovedale school in 1957, to finish his last two years. He twice finished two school grades in a single year. When Hani was 12 years old, after hearing his father's explanations about apartheid and the African National Congress, he wished to join the ANC but was still too young to be accepted. In Lovedale school, Hani joined the ANC Youth League when he was 15 years old, even though political activities were not allowed at black schools under apartheid. He influenced other students to join the ANC.

In 1959, at the University of Fort Hare in Alice, Eastern Cape, Hani studied English, Latin and modern and classical literature. He did not participate in any sport, saying "I would rather fight apartheid than play sport". Hani, in an interview on the Wankie campaign, mentioned that he was a Rhodes University graduate.

Political and military career
At age 15 he joined the ANC Youth League. As a student he was active in protests against the Bantu Education Act. He worked as a clerk for a law firm. Following his graduation, he joined Umkhonto we Sizwe (MK), the armed wing of the ANC. Following his arrest under the Suppression of Communism Act, he went into exile in Lesotho in 1963. Because of Hani's involvement with Umkhonto we Sizwe he was forced into hiding by the South African government during which time he changed his first name to Chris.

He received military training in the Soviet Union and served in campaigns in the Zimbabwean War of Liberation, also called the Rhodesian Bush War. They were joint operations between Umkhonto we Sizwe (MK) and the Zimbabwe People's Revolutionary Army in the late 1960s. The Luthuli Detachment operation consolidated Hani's reputation as a soldier in the black army that took the field against apartheid and its allies. His role as a fighter from the earliest days of MK's exile (following the arrest of Nelson Mandela and the other internal MK leaders at Rivonia) was an important part in the fierce loyalty Hani enjoyed in some quarters later as MK's Deputy Commander (Joe Modise was overall commander). In 1969 he co-signed, with six others, the 'Hani Memorandum' which was strongly critical of the leadership of Joe Modise, Moses Kotane and other comrades in the leadership.

In Lesotho he organised guerrilla operations of the MK in South Africa. By 1982, Hani had become prominent enough that he was the target of assassination attempts, and he eventually moved to the ANC's headquarters in Lusaka, Zambia. As head of Umkhonto we Sizwe, he was responsible for the suppression of a mutiny by dissident anti-Communist ANC members in detention camps, but denied any role in abuses including torture and murder. Many MK female operatives like Dipuo Mvelase adored Chris Hani for having protected women's rights and caring about their wellbeing at military camps.

Having spent time as a clandestine organiser in South Africa in the mid-1970s, he permanently returned to South Africa following the unbanning of the ANC in 1990, and took over from Joe Slovo as head of the South African Communist Party on 8 December 1991. He supported the suspension of the ANC's armed struggle in favour of negotiations.

Assassination

Chris Hani was assassinated on 10 April 1993 outside his home in Dawn Park, a racially mixed suburb of Boksburg. He was accosted by a Polish far-right anti-communist immigrant named Janusz Waluś, who shot him as he stepped out of his car. Waluś fled the scene but was soon arrested after Margareta Harmse, a white Afrikaner housewife, saw Waluś straight after the crime as she was driving past, and called the police. A neighbour of Hani also witnessed the crime and later identified both Waluś, and the vehicle he was driving at the time. Clive Derby-Lewis, a senior South African Conservative Party MP and Shadow Minister for Economic Affairs at the time, who had lent Waluś his pistol, was also arrested for complicity in Hani's murder. The Conservative Party of South Africa had broken away from the ruling National Party out of opposition to the reforms of P. W. Botha. After the elections of 1989, it was the second-strongest party in the House of Assembly, after the National Party, and opposed F. W. de Klerk's dismantling of apartheid.

Historically, the assassination is seen as a turning point. Serious tensions followed the assassination, with fears that the country would erupt in violence. Nelson Mandela addressed the nation appealing for calm, in a speech regarded as presidential even though he was not yet president of the country:

While riots followed the assassination, both sides of the negotiation process were galvanised into action, and they soon agreed that the democratic elections should take place on 27 April 1994, just over a year after Hani's assassination.

Assassins' conviction and amnesty hearing
In October 1993, both Janusz Waluś and Clive Derby-Lewis were convicted for the murder and sentenced to death. Derby-Lewis's wife, Gaye, was acquitted. Both men's sentences were commuted to life imprisonment when the death penalty was abolished as a result of a Constitutional Court ruling in 1995.

Hani's killers appeared before the Truth and Reconciliation Commission, claiming political motivation for their crimes and applying for amnesty on the basis that they had acted on the orders of the Conservative Party. The Hani family was represented by the anti-apartheid lawyer George Bizos. Their applications were denied when the TRC ruled that they had not acted under orders. After several failed attempts, Derby-Lewis was granted medical parole in May 2015 after he had been diagnosed with terminal lung cancer; he died 18 months later, on 3 November 2016.

On 10 March 2016, the North Gauteng High Court of South Africa ordered Waluś to be released on parole under bail conditions. The Department of Justice and Correctional Services lodged an appeal against the parole decision to the Supreme Court of Appeals in Bloemfontein. The Department of Home Affairs has indicated that Waluś may have his South African citizenship revoked. On 18 August 2017, the Supreme Court of Appeal in Bloemfontein overturned Waluś's parole, a decision that was welcomed by the SACP. By October 2019, Waluś was still in prison, despite his lawyer's claim that he is completely rehabilitated. On 16 March 2020, Waluś was again denied parole by Justice Minister Ronald Lamola. On 7 December 2022, Waluś was granted parole under strict conditions by Justice Minister Ronald Lamola.

Conspiracy theories surrounding assassination
Hani's assassination has attracted numerous conspiracy theories about outside involvement. The final report of the Truth and Reconciliation Commission, however, said that it "was unable to find evidence that the two murderers convicted of the killing of Chris Hani took orders from international groups, security forces or from higher up in the right-wing echelons." In December of 1992, police raided the San Francisco and Los Angeles headquarters of the Anti-Defamation League after one of their investigators and a former police officer was seen talking to South African agents. Of the over 12,000 files they uncovered regarding various spying activities conducted by ADL agents, one file revealed a report on Hani's visit to California one week before he returned home and was assassinated. ADL director Abraham Foxman told the Northern California Jewish Bulletin that spying on the ANC was justified, stating that they were "violent, antisemitic, pro-PLO and anti-Israel". The ADL would later pay out $178,000 to plaintiffs in a civil suit for colluding with the South African apartheid regime to spy on activists, Arab's, and Jewish dissidents.

Influence
Hani was a charismatic leader, with significant support among the radical anti-apartheid youth. At the time of his death, he was the most popular ANC leader after his senior, Nelson Mandela. Following the legalisation of the ANC, Hani's support for the negotiation process with the apartheid government was critical in keeping the militants in line.

Honours

In 1993, French philosopher Jacques Derrida dedicated Spectres de Marx (1993) to Hani.

  (posthumously)
  (posthumously)
  (posthumously)
  (posthumously)
  (posthumously)
  (posthumously)
  (posthumously)
  (posthumously)

In 1997, Baragwanath Hospital, one of the largest hospitals in the world, was renamed the Chris Hani Baragwanath Hospital in his memory. In September 2004, Hani was voted 20th in the controversial Top 100 Greatest South Africans poll.

Days after his assassination, the rock group Dave Matthews Band (whose lead singer and guitarist, Dave Matthews, is from South Africa) began playing what would become "#36", with lyrics and chorus referring to Hani's shooting.

A short opera Hani by composer Bongani Ndodana-Breen with libretto by film producer Mfundi Vundla was commissioned by Cape Town Opera and University of Cape Town premiering at the Baxter Theatre 21 November 2010.

A District Municipality in the Eastern Cape was named the Chris Hani District Municipality. This district includes Queenstown, Cofimvaba and Lady Frere. The Thembisile Hani Local Municipality in Mpumalanga also bears his name.

In 2009, after extension of Cape Town's Central Line, the new terminus serving eastern areas of Khayelitsha was christened Chris Hani.

References

External links

  A 1992 long interview with Chris Hani, including about his recruitment to the SACP, underground work and leadership of MK

1942 births
1993 deaths
African National Congress politicians
Anti-apartheid activists
Assassinated activists
Assassinated South African activists
Assassinated South African politicians
Deaths by firearm in South Africa
People from Intsika Yethu Local Municipality
People murdered in South Africa
Rhodes University alumni
South African communists
South African Communist Party politicians
South African revolutionaries
University of Fort Hare alumni
Xhosa people
South African expatriates in the Soviet Union
UMkhonto we Sizwe personnel
People of the Rhodesian Bush War